The 1928 All-Ireland Junior Hurling Championship Final was the ??th All-Ireland Final and the culmination of the 1928 All-Ireland Junior Hurling Championship, an inter-county hurling tournament for teams in Ireland. The match was held on 5 May 1929 between Tipperary and Kilkenny.

Match details

References
 Corry, Eoghan, The GAA Book of Lists (Hodder Headline Ireland, 2005).
 Donegan, Des, The Complete Handbook of Gaelic Games (DBA Publications Limited, 2005).

1
Kilkenny GAA matches